Italian folk music has a deep and complex history. National unification came quite late to the Italian peninsula, so its many hundreds of separate cultures remained un-homogenized until quite recently. Moreover, Italian folk music reflects Italy's geographic position at the south of Europe and in the center of the Mediterranean Sea: Celtic, Slavic, Arabic, Greek, Spanish and Byzantine influences are readily apparent in the musical styles of the Italian regions. Italy's rough geography and the historic dominance of small city states has allowed quite diverse musical styles to coexist in close proximity.

Today, Italy's folk music is often divided into several spheres of geographic influence, a classification system proposed by Alan Lomax in 1956 and often repeated since. The Celtic and Slavic influences on the group and open-voice choral works of the Northern Italy contrast with the Greek, Byzantine, and Arabic influenced strident monody of the Southern Italy. In the Central Italy these influences combine, while indigenous traditions like narrative and ballad singing remain.  The music of the island of Sardinia is distinct from that of the rest of Italy, and is best known for the polyphonic chanting of the tenores.

Italian folk revival

The modern understanding of Italian folk music has its roots in the growth of ethnomusicology in the 1940s and 1950s and in the resurgence of regionalism in Italy at the time.  The Centro Nazionale di Studi di Musica Popolare (CNSMP), now part of the Accademia Nazionale di Santa Cecilia, was started in 1948 to study and archive the various musical styles throughout Italy.  In the 1950s, a number of important field recordings were conducted by American Alan Lomax and Italians Diego Carpitella, Franco Coggiola, Roberto Leydi among others. Toward the end of the decade, a special effort was made to capture the folk traditions of the Meridione (southern Italy), including an important study by Carpitella and anthropologist Ernesto de Martino of the tarantella.

The early 1960s saw the rise of social and political popular music, including a vast number of releases by the I Dischi del Sole label. Several important groups had their birth around the same time, including Cantacronache in 1958 and the Nuovo Canzoniere Italiano (NCI) in 1962. The NCI was an assemblage of musicians and composers including Giovanna Marini that made its first major public appearance at the 1964 Spoleto Festival dei Due Mondi and generated a large number of records and concerts.

The Italian folk revival was accelerating by 1966, when the Istituto Ernesto de Martino was founded by Gianni Bosio in Milan to document Italian oral culture and traditional music. With the emergence of the Nuova Compagnia di Canto Popolare in 1970, the notion of a musical group organized to promote the music of a particular region (in this case, Campania) was clearly gaining momentum.  Many of the best known Italian folk revival bands got their start in the following decade, including La Lionetta (1977), Tre Martelli (1977), La Ciapa Rusa (1978), Re Niliu (1979), Calicanto (1981), and Baraban (1983).

Northern & central Italy

The northern regions of Italy historically exhibited Celtic and Slavic influences in their cultures. Roots revivalists have revived traditional songs, though, from Piedmont (La Ciapa Rusa, Tre Martelli), Lombardy (Barabàn, Pandemonio) and Veneto (Calicanto).

The Genoese docks are the home of trallalero, a polyphonic vocal style with five voices, one of which imitates a guitar.  It arose in the 1920s and includes modern groups like La Squadra -- Compagnia del Trallalero and Laura Parodi.

The highly urban provinces of northern and central Italy are also known for the medieval sung poetry ottava rima, especially in Tuscany, Lazio and Abruzzo.  Ottava rima is performed by the poeti contadini (peasant poets) who use the poems of Homer or Dante, as well as more modern lyrics which address political or social issues.  It is often completely improvised, and sometimes competitive in nature.  Tuscan folk poetry is closer in form and style to high-culture poetry than is typical elsewhere in Italy.

The saltarello dance is also popular throughout the region. Canzoniere del Lazio is one of the biggest names from central Italy during the 1970s roots revival.  With socially aware lyrics, this new wave of Italian roots revivalists often played entirely acoustic songs with influences from jazz and others.  More modern musicians in the same field include Lucilla Galeazzi, La Piazza and La Macina.

Southern Italy

A folk dance called the tarantella is still sometimes performed.  It was performed to cure the bite of Lycosa tarantula, usually with female victims dancing until exhaustion. Performers used varying rhythms according to the exact kind of spider.

Antonio Infantino has explored the percussion-based tarantolati healing rituals since 1975, when he formed the group Tarantolati di Tricarico.

Puglia is also home to brass bands like Banda Cittá Ruvo Di Puglia; this tradition has led to collaborations with jazz musicians like Matteo Salvatore, Battista Lena, Eugenio Colombo, Natale Galletta and Enrico Rava.

Another culturally unique musical tradition in Southern Italy is the zampogna, a form of bagpipe originally played by the shepherd class and is still prevalent in the mountainous regions of Southern Italy and Sicily. The Zampogna, in addition to secular use is associated with the annunciation of Christ and it is still not uncommon to see a zampogna player at a nativity scene during the Christmas season.  The zampogna is most likely a direct descendant of the Greek aulos and more similar Roman tibia utricularis.

Ethnic Greeks

The ethnic Greeks living in Salento (Puglia) and Calabria have their own distinct dialects (Griko and Grecanico, respectively).  They have lived in the area for an undetermined amount of time, possibly as early as Ancient Greece or as late as the Middle Ages.  The community has been largely assimilated by the Italian nation, but there remain speakers of the dialects and other aspects of the culture.  There was a roots revival in the 1970s in this area, paralleling similar developments across continental Europe, including Brittany and Catalonia.

Folk musical traditions in the area include a religious piece, Passiuna tu Christù, which recounts the Passion of Christ.  The Passion is performed by street accordionists with two singers. An example of a pizzica song from Salento region is Kali Nifta (Good night). The lyrics were written in Griko by Vito Domenico Palumbo (1856–1918).

Sicily

Sicily is home to a great variety of religious music, including a cappella devotional songs from Montedoro and many brass bands like Banda Ionica, who play songs from a diverse repertoire. Harvest songs and work songs are also indigenous to the agricultural island, known as "Italy's granary". Franco Battiato, Fratelli Mancuso, Luciano Maio, Taberna Mylaensis and Ciccio Busacca are among the most popular musicians from Sicily.  Busacca has worked with Dario Fo, like many Italian musicians, but is perhaps best known for his setting the poems of Ignazio Buttitta, a Sicilian language poet.

Fratelli Mancuso (brothers Enzo and Lorenzo Mancuso) have fused traditional Sicilian peasant songs, monodic chants and other indigenous forms to create a uniquely Sicilian modern song style.

Sardinia

Probably the most culturally distinct of all the regions in Italy, Sardinia is a Mediterranean island known for the cantu a tenore polyphonic chant, sacred songs called gozos, and launeddas, a woodwind instrument similar to the Greek aulos.  Launeddas are used to play a complex style of music that has achieved some international attention, especially Dionigi Burranca, Antonio Lara, Luigi Lai and Efisio Melis; Burranca, like many of the most famous launedda musicians, is from Samatzai in Cagliari.  An ancient instrument, dating back to at least the 8th century BC, launeddas are still played during religious ceremonies and dances (su ballu).  Distinctively, they are played using extensive variations on a few melodic phrases, and a single song can last over an hour.

The ottava, or eight-line stanza, is a common lyrical form in Sardinia, one which allows the performer a certain amount of improvisation and is not unlike the stornello of south-central mainland Italy.

Rural polyphonic chanting of the tenores is sung with four vocal parts.  They are bassu, mesa boghe, contra and boghe (respectively to be properly translated to English from Sardinian as "bass", "middle", "counter" and "soloist").  The most popular group is Tenores di Bitti.
In November 2005, the Cantu a Tenore vocal style of the Sardinian pastoral culture was proclaimed a Masterpiece of the Oral and Intangible Heritage of Humanity by UNESCO.

Sacred gozos, or sacred songs, can be heard during religious celebrations, sung by choruses like Su Cuncordu 'e su Rosariu.

Other influential Sardinian musicians include Totore Chessa (organetto), Maria Carta (singer), Mauro Palmas, Elena Ledda and Suonofficina, Cordas et Cannas, Paolo Fresu (trumpet), Gesuino Deiana (guitar), Tazenda, Marisa Sannia.

List of Italian folk songs by region

 Friuli: Quel mazzolin di fiori
 Lombardy: La Madunnina, Dormi, dormi, bel Bambin
 Piedmont: 
 Veneto: The Carnival of Venice
 Emilia-Romagna: Romagna mia
 Tuscany: Firenze sogna
 Latium: Arrivederci Roma, Chitarra romana, La Romanina
 Abruzzo: Reginella campagnola
 Calabria: Calabrisella mia, Riturnella, Vigna

Notes
  Lomax, Alan (1956). "Folk Song Style:  Notes on a Systematic Approach to the Study of Folk Song." Journal of the International Folk Music Council, VIII, 48–50.

References

Bibliography
Magrini, Tullia (2001): 'Italy: Traditional Music', "Grove Music Online". ed. L. Macy. Retrieved 1 February 2006.
Surian, Alessio. "Tenores and Tarantellas." World Music, Vol. 1: Africa, Europe and the Middle East.  Ed. Simon Broughton, Mark Ellignham, and Richard Trillo.  London: The Rough Guides., 1999, 189-201. 
Sorce Keller, Marcello. "Italy" in James Porter, Timothy Rice and Chris Goertzen (eds.), Garland Encyclopedia of World Music: Europe, New York, 2000, pp. 604– 625.
Marcello Sorce Keller, “La musique de l’émigration suisse et italienne aux États-Unis”, in L. Aubert (ed.), Musiques migrantes'', In Folio, Genève, 2005, pp. 197–210.

 
Articles containing video clips
Folk music by country